Crozier is a lunar impact crater that is located on the southwest edge of Mare Fecunditatis, a lunar mare in the eastern part of the Moon's near side. It lies to the east-northeast of the prominent crater Colombo, and southeast of the small crater Bellot.

The narrow rim of this crater forms a distorted enclosure that has outward bulges along the northwest, southwest, and southeastern sides. The interior floor has been resurfaced and nearly filled by basaltic lava, producing a level surface with a low albedo that matches the dark hue of the nearby lunar mare. Nearly adjacent to the outer rim are the similar flooded craters Crozier D to the east and Crozier M to the southeast. 

The crater is named after Irish Royal Navy officer and polar explorer Francis Crozier.

Satellite craters
By convention these features are identified on lunar maps by placing the letter on the side of the crater midpoint that is closest to Crozier.

References

 
 
 
 
 
 
 
 
 
 
 
 

Impact craters on the Moon